On 12 June 2022, a fire broke out in a bush near Aziz Bhatti Park in Gulshan-e-Iqbal area of Karachi East District, burning hundreds of vehicles including 500 motorcycles, 6 to 7 vehicles, 2 rickshaws and a bus. 255 workers die.

References

2022 in Pakistan
Karachi East District
2022 fires in Asia
Fires in Pakistan
June 2022 events in Pakistan